Obey is an album released by the Canadian death metal band Axis of Advance in September 2004.

Track listing

References

2004 albums
Axis of Advance albums